Thomas Henderson (born 1902) was an English professional footballer who played as a right back and left half in the Football League for Ashington.

Personal life 
Henderson served as a private in the Durham Light Infantry during the First World War.

References 

English footballers
English Football League players

Place of death missing
Newcastle United F.C. players
Footballers from Newcastle upon Tyne
Year of death missing
1902 births
Association football fullbacks
Military personnel from Newcastle upon Tyne
Association football wing halves
Durham Light Infantry soldiers
British Army personnel of World War I
Southampton F.C. players
Leadgate Park F.C. players
Workington A.F.C. players
Ashington A.F.C. players
Annfield Plain F.C. players
Child soldiers in World War I